General elections were held in Uruguay on 27 November 1966, alongside a constitutional referendum. The result was a victory for the Colorado Party, which won the most seats in the Chamber of Deputies and received the most votes in the presidential election.

Results

References

External links
Politics Data Bank at the Social Sciences School – Universidad de la República (Uruguay)

Elections in Uruguay
Uruguay
General
Uruguay
Election and referendum articles with incomplete results